James Edmund Neil Paterson (31 December 1915 – 19 April 1995) was a Scottish writer of novels, short stories and screenplays. He won the 1959 Academy Award for Best Adapted Screenplay for Room at the Top. Before his success as a writer, he worked in journalism and had a brief career as an amateur footballer, playing for Buckie Thistle, Leith Athletic and Dundee United in the Scottish Football League.

Early life and football career 

Born in Greenock, Renfrewshire (now part of Inverclyde), Paterson was the older of two children of James D Paterson (1880-1947) and Nicholas K Kerr (1892-1956). He graduated from the University of Edinburgh and had a brief career in senior football, playing as an inside left. Despite his success in football – he scored 9 goals from 26 league appearances for Dundee United, including a hat-trick – he remained an amateur player, spurning the opportunity to go professional. As an amateur he was automatically released at the end of the season, although he played one further game for the club in an emergency.

Writing career and later life 

After his football career finished he became a writer, initially as a sports journalist for D.C. Thomson and after the Second World War as an author, penning a number of well received novels and short stories. Paterson won the Atlantic Award for Literature in 1946.

He adapted his own short story The Kidnappers for a cinema version released in 1953. Subsequently, he wrote a number of other screenplays, including the first screen version of John Braine's novel Room at the Top (1959) which later won the Academy Award for Best Adapted Screenplay. Paterson served as a governor for the British Film Institute, National Film School and the Arts Council of Great Britain and as an executive for Grampian Television.

He died in 1995 at Crieff, Tayside (now part of Perth and Kinross).

Selected bibliography

On my Faithless Arm (1946) (Under pseudonym John Kovack)
The China Run: Being the biography of a great-grandmother (1948)
Behold Thy Daughter (1950)
The China Run: A book of short stories (1951)
Man on the Tightrope (1952)
Man on a Tightrope: The Short Novel (1953)
The Kidnappers and other Stories (1957)
Something like a poem (1986)

Selected filmography

The Kidnappers (US: The Little Kidnappers, 1953)
Man on a Tightrope (1953)
Devil on Horseback (1954)
The Woman for Joe (1955)
High Tide at Noon (1957)
The Shiralee (1957)
Innocent Sinners (1958)
Room at the Top (1959)
The Spiral Road (1962)

Notes

References

External links

1915 births
1995 deaths
Scottish novelists
Scottish screenwriters
Scottish short story writers
Scottish sportswriters
Scottish footballers
Scottish Football League players
Dundee United F.C. players
Best Adapted Screenplay Academy Award winners
Alumni of the University of Edinburgh
People from Greenock
Leith Athletic F.C. players
Association football inside forwards
20th-century British novelists
20th-century British dramatists and playwrights
Edinburgh University A.F.C. players
Buckie Thistle F.C. players
Highland Football League players
20th-century British short story writers
20th-century British screenwriters